The 1972–73 RFU Knockout Cup was the second edition of England's premier rugby union club competition at the time.  Coventry won the competition defeating Bristol in the final. In the final John Pullin was stretchered off after only a few minutes with a leg injury that resulted in Bristol playing most of the  match with 14 men. The final was held at Twickenham Stadium.

Draw and results

Second round

(Metropolitan Police* progress by virtue of scoring a try)

Quarter-finals

Semi-finals

Final

References

1972–73 rugby union tournaments for clubs
1972–73 in English rugby union
RFU Knockout Cup